In music, Op. 137 stands for Opus number 137. Compositions that are assigned this number include:

 Beethoven – Fugue for String Quintet, Op. 137
 Prokofiev – Piano Sonata No. 10
 Schumann – Jagdlieder (5 partsongs for men's voices with 4 horns ad lib)